The attacks on Kure and the Inland Sea by United States and British naval aircraft in late July 1945 sank most of the surviving large warships of the Imperial Japanese Navy (IJN). The United States Third Fleet's attacks on Kure Naval Arsenal and nearby ports on 24, 25, and 28 July sank an aircraft carrier, three battleships, five cruisers, and several smaller warships. During the same period the British Pacific Fleet attacked other targets in the Inland Sea region and sank two escort ships and several smaller vessels as well as damaging an escort carrier.

Prelude

In July 1945 the IJN's remaining large warships were concentrated near the major naval base of Kure. The ships were immobilized by fuel shortages and were being used only as stationary anti-aircraft batteries. Admiral John S. McCain, Sr., the commander of the Fast Carrier Task Force, strongly opposed attacking Kure as he and his staff believed that the ships only posed a minor threat.

In his memoirs Admiral Halsey gave four reasons for why he attacked Kure despite McCain's objections. First, he believed that the attack would boost US morale and retaliate for the Attack on Pearl Harbor in December 1941. Second, it would ensure that the Japanese could not disrupt the planned Soviet invasion of Hokkaido. Third, it would prevent Japan from using its fleet as a bargaining point to secure better peace terms. Finally, he had been ordered to conduct the attack by his superior officer, Fleet Admiral Chester W. Nimitz.

Despite operating as a task group of the US Third Fleet, the British Pacific Fleet was excluded from the attack on Kure because the Americans did not want Britain to claim a part in destroying the Japanese fleet. The BPF was instead used to attack airfields and the port of Osaka.

Kure had been subjected to several major attacks prior to July 1945. On 19 March 1945, 321 US Navy aircraft attacked Japanese warships in and around the city. This attack was unsuccessful, with no Japanese ships being sunk, though an escort carrier and a light cruiser were badly damaged. On 5 May B-29 Superfortress bombers of the United States Army Air Forces successfully bombed the Hiro Naval Aircraft Factory. B-29s laid naval mines in the approaches to the port on 30 March and 5 May, and 40 percent of the city was destroyed in a major air raid conducted by Superfortresses on 1 July.

Participating in the attacks were Task Force 38 for the Americans and Task Force 37 for the British.

Battle

The Third Fleet's attack against Kure began on 24 July. US carrier aircraft flew 1,747 sorties on this day against Japanese targets. The attacks sank the aircraft carrier  and the cruiser , which was acting as the Combined Fleet's flagship. The shallow anchorage precluded the use of torpedoes. The US aircraft attempted to reduce their losses from the large number of anti-aircraft guns in the area by the use of variable time-fused bombs.

The British Pacific Fleet's attacks against Osaka and targets in the Inland Sea damaged the escort carrier  and sank the escort ships No. 4 and No. 30 for the loss of four aircraft.

US strikes against Kure resumed on 28 July, damaging the battleships Ise and Haruna and the heavy cruiser Aoba. The aircraft carrier  which had largely escaped attack in the earlier raid, and the unserviceable light aircraft carrier  were attacked, with Katsuragi suffering heavy damage. These air strikes were among the largest conducted by the US Navy during the war, and were the most destructive of shipping.

On 28 July, the USAAF attacked Kure ships with 79 B-24 Liberators from Okinawa. Four bomb hits were made upon the beached cruiser Aoba, breaking off her stern. Two B-24s were shot down and 14 others damaged.

Allied losses included 102 aircrew and 133 planes lost in combat or accidents during the attacks. These losses were higher than those suffered by the Third Fleet in most of its operations, and were the result of the heavy anti-aircraft defences around Kure.

Aftermath
The Allied attacks on Kure and the inland sea left  at Yokosuka as the only remaining capital ship in Japan's inventory. The destruction of the battleships and heavy cruisers at Kure was seen by British official historian Stephen Roskill as avenging the losses suffered by the United States at Pearl Harbor. The attacks allowed the Soviet Pacific Fleet to operate in the Sea of Japan without fear of attack by Japanese ships.

Gallery

References

Notes

Bibliography

External links
 

Kure
Naval battles of World War II involving Japan
Naval battles of World War II involving the United States
Kure and the Inland Sea
Japan–United Kingdom military relations
Japan–United States military relations
July 1945 events in Asia